Richard Edward Schermerhorn (October 29, 1927 – June 21, 1995) was an American politician from New York.

Life
He was born on October 29, 1927, in Albany, New York.  He was sent to a foster home when he was 3 months old, and later stated that if abortion had been legal at the time, he might never have been born.  He attended Ravena-Coeymans-Selkirk High School and Albany Military Academy and graduated M.B.A. from Bryant University.

Career
During World War II he served in the U.S. Army. He engaged in the insurance business, and entered politics as Republican.

In June 1970, he defeated the incumbent State Senator D. Clinton Dominick III in the Republican primary.  Dominick had voted for the 1970 abortion law, and Schermerhorn was a conservative anti-abortionist, who opposed abortion in all circumstances. Throughout his career, he was vocal about abortion and adoption.

He was a member of the New York State Senate from 1971 to 1988, sitting in the 179th, 180th, 181st, 182nd, 183rd, 184th, 185th, 186th and 187th New York State Legislatures.

Indictment and conviction
On July 29, 1987, federal prosecutors accused Schermerhorn of having taken a bribe in 1984 from Dominick Lofaro, an ex-mafioso-turned-informer. The facts were then re-evaluated, and the bribe became a campaign contributions from Lofaro which had not been listed by Schermerhorn in his election campaign financial statement. Therefore, on September 23, 1988, he was indicted by a federal grand jury for fraud. On November 2, 1988, he was also indicted for tax evasion. and obstruction of justice. In 1985, he had sold his interest in a hotel, and did not report the capital gain in his tax statement. On November 8, 1988, he was defeated for re-election by Democrat E. Arthur Gray.

Schermerhorn went to trial in the United States District Court for the Southern District of New York. On October 26, 1989, Schermerhorn was acquitted on the fraud charges, but was convicted of tax evasion. On December 15, 1989, he was sentenced by Judge Gerard Goettel to a year and a half in jail, and afterwards two years probation.  On July 2, 1991, he was released from Federal Prison Camp, Montgomery, and transferred to the Brooklyn Community Corrections Center.

After serving his prison term, he became a lobbyist in Albany.

Personal life
He married Connie Edwards, and they had four daughters.

He died on June 21, 1995, at his home in Newburgh, New York, of throat cancer; and was buried at the Calvary Cemetery in New Windsor.

References

External links
 

1927 births
1995 deaths
Politicians from Albany, New York
Republican Party New York (state) state senators
Politicians from Newburgh, New York
Deaths from cancer in New York (state)
Bryant University alumni
New York (state) politicians convicted of crimes
20th-century American politicians